"Deeper Than the Night" is a song by Olivia Newton-John.  It was released as the second single from Newton-John's tenth studio album,  Totally Hot. 

Record World said that it "features a wailing guitar line and a strong rock beat."

The song reached No. 11 on the US Billboard Hot 100 and No. 18 in Canada. On the adult contemporary charts it was a bigger hit, reaching No. 4 and No. 7 in those countries, respectively. It was also a minor hit in both the UK and Australia.

Track listing and formats 
All tracks produced by John Farrar.
Australian 7-inch vinyl single (Interfusion Records)
A. "Deeper Than the Night" (Snow, Vastano) – 3:35
B. "Please Don't Keep Me Waiting" (Joe Falsia, Stephen Sinclair) – 5:48

UK 7-inch vinyl single (EMI Records)
A. "Deeper Than the Night" (Snow, Vastano) – 3:35
B. "Please Don't Keep Me Waiting" (Falsia, Sinclair) – 5:48

US/Canadian 7-inch vinyl single (MCA Records)
A. "Deeper Than the Night" (Snow, Vastano) – 3:35
B. "Please Don't Keep Me Waiting" (Falsia, Sinclair) – 5:48

Charts

Weekly charts

Year-end charts

References

External links
 

1978 songs
1979 singles
Olivia Newton-John songs
Songs written by Tom Snow
MCA Records singles
American soft rock songs
1970s ballads
Songs about nights